Carol Ann Rodríguez Taylor (born 26 December 1985 in Pomona, California) is a Puerto Rican sprinter.  Her mother was an African American from New Orleans, and her father grew up in Yauco, Puerto Rico.

Carol Rodríguez is currently the Host of Sports Run and Then Some on iCraft Radio on Dash Radio.

Career
Rodríguez competed in both the 200 and 400 metres at the 2008 Olympic Games, and the 400 metres at the 2012 Summer Olympics, without reaching the final round.

She has 22.23 seconds in the 200 meters, achieved in May 2006 in Provo; 51.39 seconds in the 400 meters, achieved in June 2008 in Des Moines; 11.28 seconds in the 100 meters, achieved in May 2009 in New York City; and 7.56 seconds in the 60 metres, achieved in January 2006 in Pullman.

Rodríguez grew up in Southern California, attending Western High School in Anaheim, California for her first three years.  At the 2003 CIF California State Meet, she finished third in the 100 metres behind Allyson Felix and Shalonda Solomon as a junior, but did not make it back to the meet her senior year after she transferred to Long Beach Wilson High School.

She next went to the University of Southern California majoring in sociology.  At the 2006 NCAA Women's Outdoor Track and Field Championships she finished third in the 100m, fourth in the 200m and anchored USC's third place 4x100 metres relay team.  The relay team repeated their third-place finish in 2007, while Rodriguez finished fourth in the 100m.  She holds the USC school record in the 200m (surpassing World Champion Inger Miller) and 400m.

Personal bests

Achievements

1: Did not start in the final.

References

External links

1985 births
Living people
Puerto Rican female sprinters
Athletes (track and field) at the 2008 Summer Olympics
Athletes (track and field) at the 2012 Summer Olympics
Athletes (track and field) at the 2007 Pan American Games
Athletes (track and field) at the 2015 Pan American Games
Olympic track and field athletes of Puerto Rico
Sportspeople from Pomona, California
Track and field athletes from California
Puerto Rican people of African-American descent
World Athletics Championships athletes for Puerto Rico
Central American and Caribbean Games gold medalists for Puerto Rico
Central American and Caribbean Games silver medalists for Puerto Rico
Competitors at the 2010 Central American and Caribbean Games
Central American and Caribbean Games medalists in athletics
Pan American Games competitors for Puerto Rico
21st-century Puerto Rican women